All Saints’ Church, Brailsford is a Grade I listed parish church in the Church of England in Brailsford, Derbyshire.

History
The church dates from the 12th century. It comprises a west tower, nave with south aisle, chancel and north vestry. It was restored between 1882 and 1883 when the galleries were removed. The walls and pillars of the church were scraped of plaster and whitewash. The stonework of the doors and windows was cleaned and restored by Mr. Walker of Ashbourne. The pews were removed and oak benches installed. The floor of the nave was relaid with oak blocks and the chancel was laid with Minton encaustic tiles.

Parish status
The church is in a joint parish with 
St James' Church, Edlaston
St Martin's Church, Osmaston
St Michael's Church, Shirley
Holy Trinity Church, Yeaveley

Memorials
Edward Cox (d. 1846) by Hall of Derby
Annie Mosse (d. 1868) by Hall of Derby
Mary Horsfall (d. 1862) by Hall of Derby
Thomas Cox (d. 1842) by Hall of Derby
John Boden (d. 1840) by Hall of Derby
Anna Palmer (d. 1840) by Hall of Derby
William Cox (d. 1900) by Lomas of Derby
Roger Cox (d. 1843) and Francis Cox (d. 1853) by J B Robinson of Derby
Dorothy Draper (d. 1683)

Organ
The pipe organ was built by Harrison and Harrison and dates from 1914. A specification of the organ can be found on the National Pipe Organ Register.

Bells
The church tower contains a peal of 6 bells, with 3, 4, and 5 dating from 1717 by Abraham I Rudhall. The tenor and 2 are from 1816 by William Dobson and the treble is from 1956 by John Taylor & Co.

See also
Grade I listed churches in Derbyshire
Listed buildings in Brailsford

References

Church of England church buildings in Derbyshire
Grade I listed churches in Derbyshire